Pseudaeromonas paramecii is a Gram-negative, rod-shaped and motile bacterium from the genus of Pseudaeromonas which has been isolated from the ciliate Paramecium caudatum.

References 

Aeromonadales
Bacteria described in 2018